Korean Woman is a monthly magazine in North Korea, founded in September 1946. The magazine is the first one to be specifically dedicated to women. It is the official media outlet of the Socialist Women's Union of Korea.

History
The magazine started appearing regularly in 1947 and was published monthly until 1982 when it became bimonthly. The Socialist Women's Union also publishes an English-language equivalent called Women of Korea.

Contents
The magazine mainly promotes the achievements and the working and living conditions of Korean women, usually accompanied by large-scale color photos. In 1976, the newspaper published an anti-South Korea propaganda poster titled "Two opposite realities".

References

Works cited

Magazines established in 1946
Magazines published in North Korea
Women's magazines
Socialist magazines
Monthly magazines
Bi-monthly magazines